Jean-Guy Astresses (24 June 1929 – 30 March 2020) was a French footballer who played as a goalkeeper.

Biography
Astresses played out his junior career with Coqs Rouges de Bordeaux before joining FC Girondins de Bordeaux. From 1951 to 1955, he played as a backup to Pierre Bernard, appearing in 18 different matches. Girondins de Bordeaux was a finalist for the Coupe de France in 1955. He was a stand-by player at the 1952 Summer Olympics.

References

External links
 

1929 births
2020 deaths
French footballers
Association football goalkeepers
FC Girondins de Bordeaux players
Olympic footballers of France
Footballers at the 1952 Summer Olympics